John Wesley Methodist Church, also known as First Methodist Church, is a historic Methodist church on E. Foster Street in Lewisburg, Greenbrier County, West Virginia. It was built in 1820, and is a two-story, brick meeting house building with Greek Revival style design elements.  It originally measures 58 feet long by 47 feet wide.  In 1835, a vestibule addition added 10 feet to the length. The interior features a "slave gallery." During the Battle of Lewisburg, a cannonball struck the southwest corner and the repairs remain visible.

John Weir, a brickmason and architect, is traditionally accepted to have been the architect for the 1820 building.  An 1835 addition was by John W. Dunn, also a brickmason and architect.  Dunn is credited with bringing Greek Revival architecture to the area by this work.  According to the 1974 NRHP nomination, the building "remains one of the county's most stately structures".

It was listed on the National Register of Historic Places in 1974.

References

American Civil War sites in West Virginia
Buildings and structures in Greenbrier County, West Virginia
Greek Revival church buildings in West Virginia
Greenbrier County, West Virginia in the American Civil War
Methodist churches in West Virginia
National Register of Historic Places in Greenbrier County, West Virginia
Churches on the National Register of Historic Places in West Virginia
Churches completed in 1820
John W. Dunn buildings
Methodist Episcopal churches in the United States